Norma O. Walker (born June 1928) is the former mayor of Aurora, Colorado. She became the mayor of Aurora, Colorado, from 1965 to 1967. As of May 2021, Walker has been the only female mayor in that city's history. As mayor she is remembered for her work on stabilizing Aurora's water supply. Later, she went on to serve on the National Highway Safety Advisory Committee, where she served until 1969.

Born in Las Animas, Colorado, in 1928, she is of Scandinavian descent. On November 14, 1965, she appeared as a guest on the first episode of the panel show What's My Line after one of the show's regular panel members, journalist Dorothy Kilgallen, died six days earlier and five days after the Northeast blackout of 1965.

See also 
 List of first female mayors in the United States

References

External links
Video of Walker's November 1965 appearance on What's My Line? 

1928 births
Living people
Mayors of Aurora, Colorado
Women mayors of places in Colorado
21st-century American women